Afghan Breakdown (translit. Afganskiy Izlom) is a 1991 war drama film about the Soviet–Afghan War directed by Vladimir Bortko and co-produced by Italy and the Soviet Union (Lenfilm). Michele Placido plays the protagonist, Major Bandura, a commander of a unit of Soviet paratroopers, co-starring with several popular Soviet actors.

The movie is still regarded by many movie critics as the best account of the war, despite newer box-office hits such as The 9th Company. Director Vladimir Bortko invited Mikhail Leshchinskiy (a Soviet TV war reporter who worked in Afghanistan for 4.5 years) as a co-writer and visited Kabul and Kandahar in 1988 to research on the ground.

Plot
The events unfold just before the start of the Soviet withdrawal from Afghanistan in 1988. Lieutenant Steklov, son of a high-ranking General, is assigned to Afghanistan, hoping to take part in combat and earn some medals before the war ends. Sgt. Arsionov (Aleksei Serebryakov) combines his combat experience and bravery with brutal hazing of young conscripts back on the field base. Major Bandura's tour of duty has expired. He is free to go home and reunite with his wife whom he has almost forgot. This means leaving his mistress Katya (Tatyana Dogileva), a nurse in the base's hospital—to much anticipation from Bandura's superior Leonid (Mikhail Zhygalov), who is in love with Katya. Anxiety is felt by many characters about the politico-social changes taking place back in the Soviet Union during the Perestroika. Bandura himself thinks he might not be able to adapt. Katya says that Afghanistan will be remembered as the best part of their lives.

The Soviets arrange a deal with a local Afghan warlord that he won't take action against the withdrawing Soviet troops in exchange for weapons and supplies. When asked why he needs more weapons as the war seems to be coming to an end, he replies that his war will go on for a very long time. On its way back to base the convoy that has delivered the supplies is ambushed by another faction of the Mujahideen. The paratroopers take cover and fight back with only a few casualties, but the road is blocked by a damaged fuel tanker. While Bandura personally drives a tank to push the tanker off the road, the inexperienced Steklov dashes forward attempting to lead troops to counterattack and is badly wounded. Later, his leg is amputated at the hospital, which adds to the stack of Bandura's career problems. Bandura decides to stay with his men for a while and lead a retaliatory mission to kill a Mujahideen leader, who is presumed wounded and taken to the neutral warlord's village. When the preparations are finished, Bandura comes to say good bye to Katya, who is scheduled to leave the country on the morrow. A junkie soldier at the hospital insults him by insubordination but Bandura suddenly shows no will for disciplining him. Instead, he requests to be replaced by some other officer on the mission, citing a sore foot as a pretext. But after realization that his company is setting out, he resumes command. It goes awry again when the neutral warlord is accidentally killed in the raid and his men become hostile and together with the Mujahideen attack the paratroopers. Bandura is able to pull his unit out mostly intact, but they are pinned down and call in an Mi-24 airstrike that obliterates the village. After the strike, Bandura becomes apathetic, and without apparent reason, re-enters the village alone. He finds nobody alive except for a 10-year boy clinging to an AK-47. Bandura hesitates, unsure what to do, then walks away, allowing the boy to shoot him in the back and kill him. The final scene shows dozens of Soviet helicopters flying away from the devastated village.

See also
The 9th Company
The Beast
Lone Survivor (film)

References

External links

1990 films
Lenfilm films
Soviet war films
Italian war films
1990s Russian-language films
Films directed by Vladimir Bortko
Films set in Afghanistan
Films set in 1988
Soviet–Afghan War films
Soviet multilingual films
Italian multilingual films
1991 multilingual films